Amézaga is a surname of Basque origin. Notable people with the surname include:

Alfredo Amézaga (born 1978), Mexican-American baseball player
Juan José de Amézaga (1881–1956), Uruguayan politician

Basque-language surnames